For the botanist see Edward Lee Greene

Edward Lawrence Greene (March 29, 1884 – September 27, 1952) was an American football player and coach of football and baseball.

Biography
Greenewas born on March 29, 1884 in New Haven, Connecticut.

He served as the head football coach at the University of North Carolina at Chapel Hill in 1908 and at North Carolina College of Agriculture and Mechanic Arts, now North Carolina State University, from 1909 to 1913, compiling a career college football record of 28–11–5. Greene was also the head baseball coach at North Carolina A&M for one season in 1912, tallying a mark of 13–6–1. He played college football at the University of Pennsylvania, where he was named an All-American in 1906. He later served as the general manager of the National Better Business Bureau until his death.

He died of a heart attack on September 27, 1952  in Mamaroneck, New York.

Head coaching record

Football

Baseball

References

1884 births
1952 deaths
American football halfbacks
NC State Wolfpack baseball coaches
NC State Wolfpack football coaches
North Carolina Tar Heels football coaches
Penn Quakers football players
Sportspeople from New Haven, Connecticut
Players of American football from New Haven, Connecticut